Coatzospan Mixtec (Coatzóspam Mixtec) is a Mixtec language of Oaxaca spoken in the town of San Juan Coatzospan.

Phonology
Consonants in parentheses are marginal.

In women's speech,  is realized as  before front vowels. 

Vowels may be oral or nasal, creaky or modal, long or short: e.g. "to go".  is apparently never contrastively nasalized, though it may be phonetically nasalized due to assimilation with a nasal vowel in a following syllable, and morphologically nasalized for the second-person familiar (e.g. 'to come',  'you will come'). The preceding vowel nasalizes only if the intervening consonant is voiced, or in some words . Nonetheless, even voiceless fricatives and affricates are phonetically nasalized in such environments: ; the nasalization is visible in the flaring of the nostrils. 

The first vowel of a disyllable is creaky if the second consonant is voiceless (except for ); only when C2 is voiced or  can there be a contrast between creaky and modal vowels in V1. The irregular behavior  is apparently due to it deriving from proto-Mixtec from both voiceless velar  and voiced  ("*y"). It is words in which  derives from *j that allow V1 to be nasalized or contrastively modally voiced. 

Tones are ...

References 

 Gerfen, Chip. 1999. Phonology and Phonetics in Coatzospan Mixtec (Studies in Natural Language and Linguistic Theory 48). Springer-Science+Business Media, B.V.
 
 Pike, Eunice V. & Priscilla C. Small. 1974. Downstepping terrace tone in Coatzospan Mixtec. In Ruth M. Brend (ed.), Advances in tagmemics (North-Holland Linguistic Series 9), 105-34. Amsterdam: North-Holland.

Mixtec language